The Kheng Hock Temple, also known as the Kheng Hock Keong (慶福宮), is the largest and oldest temple to the Chinese sea-goddess Mazu in Yangon, Burma. It is located on the corner of Sintodan Street and Strand Road in Latha Township. Kheng Hock Keong is maintained by a Hokkien Chinese clan association. The temple attracts mostly Hokkien and Hakka worshipers, while the other temple in Latha Township, called the Guanyin Gumiao Temple, attracts Cantonese worshipers.

Establishment 
It was originally built as a wooden temple in 1861 and completed in 1863, built in the Fujian style, on a tax-exempt plot of land granted by the British authorities. The founding Kheng Hock Keong Trust Committee was composed of Rangoon's largest Hokkien clans, representing the Chan-Khoo, Lim, Tan, Yeo, Lee, and Su clans. At the temple's founding, the primary deity was Guanyin. A new brick building was completed in 1903, costing over 153,000 rupees.

Gallery

References

See also
Fushan Temple
Guanyin Gumiao Temple
Long Shan Tang Temple
 Qianliyan & Shunfeng'er

Buildings and structures in Yangon
Hokkien place names